David Martin Ruprecht (born October 14, 1948) is an American television actor and game show host, primarily known for his work as host of the Lifetime/PAX game show Supermarket Sweep.

Career 
Ruprecht has hosted the live stage show version of The Price Is Right at casinos in Las Vegas, Atlantic City, Mississippi and Connecticut. He has also hosted Family Feud Live. He currently is one of the hosts of The Price Is Right Live Stage Show at Bally's Las Vegas.

Ruprecht began acting in television commercials in the late 1970s. 
Ruprecht guest-starred on more than 50 television shows, like Three's Company, on which his character married Janet Wood (Joyce DeWitt) in the series finale, HBO's True Blood, and the 1981 TV-movie The Harlem Globetrotters on Gilligan's Island as Thurston Howell IV, the son of Thurston Howell III. From 1990 to 1992, he played Dan Ryan on the NBC soap opera Days of Our Lives. He co-starred in the Broadway and Showtime productions of Perfectly Frank and did voice-over work for the 1985 animated series Yogi's Treasure Hunt.

In 1990, Ruprecht began hosting Supermarket Sweep and held the job until the show's cancellation in 2003.

Personal life 
Ruprecht was born in St. Louis, Missouri, to a Lutheran minister. Ruprecht previously served on the board of directors for the Downsize DC Foundation. He is a former Executive Director of the Libertarian Party of California and a long-time member of Rotary International. 

He has been married twice. His first marriage to actress Ann Wilkinson ended in divorce. He married choreographer Patti Colombo in November 1988.

He is a practicing member of the Lutheran Church–Missouri Synod.

Select filmography

References

External links 

David Ruprecht's Official Website

1948 births
Living people
20th-century American male actors
21st-century American male actors
American game show hosts
American Lutherans
American male soap opera actors
American male voice actors
American male television actors
American male writers
California Libertarians
Male actors from St. Louis
People from Greater Los Angeles
Valparaiso University alumni